Varcoe Headland is a low headland, with an elevation of 34 m, that marks the north entrance point to Horseshoe Bay in west Ross Island. It was named by the New Zealand Geographic Board (NZGB) after Technical Services Officer Garth Edwin Varcoe, who worked in the New Zealand Antarctic Programme over a period of 15 years until his accidental death in a helicopter crash near this headland in October 1992. His expertise was in the mechanical and electrical areas and he played a leading role in the reconstruction of Scott Base.

Headlands of Ross Island